was a Japanese actor. He was most famous for playing villains.
He often worked with Kinji Fukasaku.

Narita graduated from Haiyuza Theatre Company acting school and joined Daiei Film. His career as a screen actor started in 1963. His film debut was the 1963 film Kōkō Sannensei. He gradually won fame by playing the role of the villains. In 1971, Narita left Daiei and  became a freelance actor. AS a freelance actor he appeared in many yakuza films produced by Toei film company. In Japan he is best known for his role in Tantei Monogatari(TV series). He is also well known for his part in Battles Without Honor and Humanity series. He also portrayed the evil character in Mito Kōmon (3rd season).

He died of Linitis plastica  on 9 April 1990. His final film role was in the 1990 film "Jipangu".

Filmography

Film

Yarareru mae ni yare (1964)
Zoku kôkô san'nensei (1964) - Tetsuo Murayama
Yadonashi inu (1964)
Kenka inu (1964)
Kenji Kirishima Saburô (1964) - Shinichirô Tatsuta
Hanzai kyoshitsu (1964)
Urakaidan (1965) - Inumaru
Waka oyabun (1965) - Naojiro
The Hoodlum Soldier (1965) - MP
Seisaku no tsuma (1965) - MP
A, zerosen (1965) - Yagi
Suri (1965)
Gakusei jingi (1965)
Mesuinu dassô (1965) - Miyauchi
Zatoichi and the Chess Expert (1965) - Tadasu Jumonji
Za gaadoman-Tôkyô ninja (1965)
Yorû no kunshô (1965)
Kumo o yobu kôdôkan (1965)
The Guardman: Tokyo Ninja Butai (1966) - Gorô Kimoto
Hyoten (1966) - Murai
Kisama to ore (1966)
Yabure shomôn (1966)
Shutsû goku no sakazuki (1966)
Shin heitai yakuza (1966)
Heitai yakuza daidasso (1966)
Abura no shitatari (1967)
A Certain Killer (1967)
Nemuri Kyôshirô burai-hikae: Mashô no hada (1967) - Ukon Saegusa
Yoru no nâwabarî (1967)
Umî no G-Men: taiheiyô no yojinbô (1967)
Kaidan otoshiana (1968) - Haruo Kuramoto
Onna tobakushi tekkaba yaburi (1968)
Nemuri Kyoshiro engetsu sappo (1969)
Tejo muyô (1969)
Showa onna jingi (1969)
Onna tobakushi saikoro kesshô (1969)
Onna tobaku-shi tsubo kurabe (1970)
Abuku zenî (1970)
Shinjuku outlaw: Step On the Gas (1970)
Minagoroshi no sukyattô (1970)
Onna kumichô (1970)
Ônna himitsu chosain-kuchibiru ni kakerô (1970)
Gyakuen Mitsusakazuki (1971)
Kage Gari Hoero taiho (1972) - Gekko 'Sunlight'
Ôkami yakuza: Tomurai ha ore ga dasu (1972)
Kage Gari (1972) - Moonlight
Battles Without Honor and Humanity (1973)
Battles Without Honor and Humanity: Deadly Fight in Hiroshima (1973) - Matsunaga Hiroshi
Female Convict Scorpion: Beast Stable (1973) - Detective Kondo
Battles Without Honor and Humanity: Proxy War (1973) - Matsunaga Hiroshi
Gendai ninkyô-shi (1973) - Nakagawa
Hanzo the Razor – Who's Got the Gold? (1974) - Bansaku Tonami
Kuroi Mehyô M (1974) - Hayami
Andô-gumi gaiden: Hitokiri shatei (1974)
Mamushi no kyôdai: Futari awasete sanjuppan (1974)
Graveyard of Honor (1975) - Noboru Kajiki
Cops vs. Thugs (1975) - Katsumi Kawade
Nihon bôryôku rettô: Keihanshin koroshi no gundan (1975)
Champion of Death (1975) - Nakasone
New Battles Without Honor and Humanity: The Boss's Head (1975) - Aihara
New Battles Without Honor and Humanity: The Boss's Last Days (1976) - Koji Matsuoka
Bakamasa horamasa toppamasa (1976)
Yakuza Graveyard (1976) - Nozaki
Okinawa Yakuza sensô (1976) - Onaga
Yakuza senso: Nihon no Don (1977) - Seiji Kataoka
Utamaro: Yume to shiriseba (1977) - Juzaburo Tsutaya
Hokuriku Proxy War (1977) - Mr. Yobu
Nihon no jingi (1977) - Takayuki Kawabe
Rashamen (1977)
Nishijin Shinju (1977)
Nippon no Don: Yabohen (1977) - Seiji Kataoka
Shinjuku yoidore banchi: Hitokiri tetsu (1977)
Shogun's Samurai (1978) - Ayamaro Karasumasu (Noble)
Tarao Bannai (1978) - Goro Seo
Message from Space (1978) - Rockseia XII
Bandits vs. Samurai Squadron (1978) - Fukuzaemon
Never Give Up (1978) - Nakado (yakuza)
The Fall of Ako Castle (1978) - Kato
Hakuchyu no shikaku (1979) - Kyozo Koiwa
Aftermath of Battles Without Honor and Humanity (1979) - Takeshi Tsugawa
Hunter in the Dark (1979) - Gosun
The Resurrection of the Golden Wolf (1979) - Koizumi
Sanada Yukimura no Bōryaku (1979) - Goto Matabei
G.I. Samurai (1979) - Kosa
Renegade ninjas (1979)
Nihon no Fixer (1979)
Kage no Gundan: Hattori Hanzo (1979)
Tokugawa ichizoku no houkai (1980)
Tosa No Ipponzuri (1980) - Yakuza Supervisor
Samurai Reincarnation (1981) - Izumori Matsudaira
Kemono-tachi no atsui nemuri (1981) - Nonoyama, Kuroyanagi's secretary
Hoero tekken (1982) - Reika
Onimasa (1982) - Tokubei Tsujihara
Yaju-deka (1982) - Kuroki
Ninja Wars (1982) - Kashin Koji
Yôkirô (1983) - Inaso
Legend of the Eight Samurai (1983) - Ohta Sukemasa
Jo no mai (1984) - Yamakan
Fireflies in the North (1984) - Kido
Kai (1985) - Bunzo Tanigawa
Seijo densetsu (1985) - Tachibana
Saigo no bakuto (1985) - Nobuo Yamatatsu
Kizudarake no kunshô (1986) - Head of Police
Be-Bop highschool: Koko yotaro elegy (1986) - Mr. Fujimoto
The Sea and Poison (1986) - Shibata
Gokudô no onna-tachi (1986) - Akimasa Koiso
Hissatsu! III Ura ka Omote ka (1986)
Kuroi doresu no onna (1987) - Ohno
Sure Death 4: Revenge (1987) - Lord Sakai
Yoshiwara enjô (1987) - Asaji Kon
Welter (1987)
Yakuza tosei no sutekina menmen (1988)
Ikidomari no Banka: Brake out (1988) - Toda
Tokugawa no Jotei: Ôoku (1988) - Shogun Ienari
A Chaos of Flowers (1988) - Harufusa Hatano
Bakayarô!: Watashi okkote masu (1988) - Tadashi Okawa (Episode 3)
Gokudo no onna-tachi: San-daime ane (1989) - Ryukichi Terada
Water Moon (1989)
Jipangu (1990) - Hayashi Razan (final film role)
Yomigaeru yusaku: Tantei monogatari tokubetsu hen (1999)

Television
Mito Kōmon 3rd season (1971-1972) - Tsuge
Shin Heike Monogatari (1972) - Fujiwara no Yorinaga
Taiyō ni Hoero! (1973 ep.17), (1974 ep.193)
Oshizamurai Kiichihōgan (1973 ep.8), (1974 ep.25)
Amigasa Jūbei (1974) - Funazu Yakurō
Edo o Kiru (3rd season) (1977) - Wakizaka Juzō
The Yagyu Conspiracy (1978) - Karasuma
Shadow Warriors (I, II, IV)
Akō Rōshi (1979) - Yanagisawa Yoshiyasu
Tantei Monogatari (1979-1980) - Detective Hattori
Tokugawa Ieyasu (1983) - Imagawa Yoshimoto
Sanbiki ga Kiru! (1988 ep.15)

References

External links
 

1935 births
1990 deaths
20th-century Japanese male actors